Thomas Oscar Fuller (25 Oct. 1867–21 June 1942) was an American Baptist minister, educator and state senator. He was elected to the North Carolina Senate in 1898 and was the only African American representative.  

Thomas Oscar Fuller was born in Franklinton, North Carolina. His father was J. Henderson Fuller, a former slave. He attended Shaw University in 1885 and graduated in 1890, he also received a master's degree in 1893. He was ordained by Wake County Baptist Association and in 1902 he was named the principal of the Howe Institute. 

The T. O. Fuller State Park is named in his honour.

Works

References

1867 births
1942 deaths
North Carolina politicians
North Carolina Senate
African-American politicians
Baptist ministers from the United States